Texas Baptist College is a Baptist college in Fort Worth, Texas, United States. It is affiliated with the Southwestern Baptist Theological Seminary (Southern Baptist Convention).

History
The college was founded in 2005 as College at Southwestern by the Southwestern Baptist Theological Seminary. 

On April 12, 2017, the college was officially renamed The L.R. Scarborough College at Southwestern Baptist Theological Seminary in honor of Lee Rutland Scarborough who served as the second seminary President of the Southwestern Baptist Theological Seminary.

In June 2021, the college was renamed from Scarborough College to Texas Baptist College.  

Dr. Adam Greenway serves as the 9th president of Southwestern Seminary and Texas Baptist College. Dr. Todd bates is the current dean of Texas Baptist College, and Dr. Micah D. Carter is the associate dean.

Accreditation 
It is affiliated with the Southwestern Baptist Theological Seminary (Southern Baptist Convention).

References

External links 
 

Universities and colleges in Fort Worth, Texas
Universities and colleges affiliated with the Southern Baptist Convention